The Gadjalivia were an indigenous Australian people of Arnhem Land in the Northern Territory. They are now regarded as extinct.

Language
Arthur Capell classified the Gadjalivia language (Gudjälavia) as a dialect of Burarra.

Country

History
Following a drastic reduction in their numbers, remnants of the tribe, surviving around the Csdell River, are said to have been assimilated into the Nagara.

Alternative names
 Gajalivia.
 Gudjalibi.
 Gudalavia.
 Gudjaliba.
 Gadjalibi.
 Gadjalibir.

Notes

Citations

Sources

Aboriginal peoples of the Northern Territory
Arnhem Land